The 1999 AT&T Challenge was a men's tennis tournament played on outdoor clay courts in Atlanta, Georgia, United States that was part of the World Series of the 1999 ATP Tour. It was the fourteenth edition of the tournament and was held from 26 April through 2 May 1999. Unseeded Stefan Koubek won the singles title.

Finals

Singles

 Stefan Koubek defeated  Sébastien Grosjean, 6–1, 6–2

Doubles

 Patrick Galbraith /  Justin Gimelstob defeated  Todd Woodbridge /  Mark Woodforde, 5–7, 7–6(7–4), 6–3

References

External links
 ITF tournament edition details

ATandT Challenge
Verizon Tennis Challenge
ATandT Challenge
1999 in sports in Georgia (U.S. state)
Tennis tournaments in Georgia (U.S. state)